Starburst is a science fiction  novel by  American writer Frederik Pohl, published in 1982.

Plot summary
A doomed astronaut crew become superpowered.

Reception
Dave Langford reviewed Starburst for White Dwarf #54, and stated that "OK at novelette length but Pohl just hinted at the details of their offstage apotheosis: but the more you hear about it the less likely it sounds, and the book becomes a prolonged anticlimax. A smooth read, yes, but the original story is diluted to insipidity."

References

1982 American novels
1982 science fiction novels
Del Rey books
Novels by Frederik Pohl